Bright Lights  is a 1935 film directed by Busby Berkeley.

Plot
Joe's (Joe E. Brown) happy marriage is threatened when an heiress falls in love with him.

Cast
 Joe E. Brown as Joe Wilson
 Ann Dvorak as Fay Wilson
 Patricia Ellis as Claire Whitmore
 William Gargan as Dan Wheeler
 Joseph Cawthorn as Oscar Schlemmer
 Henry O'Neill as J.C. Anderson
 Arthur Treacher as Wilbur
 Gordon Westcott as Wellington
 Joseph Crehan as Post Office Attendant
 William Demarest as Detective
 The Maxellos as Acrobat Act

References

External links
 
 
 
 

1935 films
1935 musical comedy films
American black-and-white films
Films directed by Busby Berkeley
Films scored by Heinz Roemheld
American musical comedy films
1930s American films